1992 Empress's Cup Final was the 14th final of the Empress's Cup competition. The final was played at Nishigaoka Soccer Stadium in Tokyo on March 28, 1993. Nikko Securities Dream Ladies won the championship.

Overview
Nikko Securities Dream Ladies won their 2nd title, by defeating Yomiuri Nippon SC Beleza 1–0.

Match details

See also
1992 Empress's Cup

References

Empress's Cup
1992 in Japanese women's football